Nationality words link to articles with information on the nation's poetry or literature (for instance, Irish or France).

Events
 French poet Louise Labe disguised herself as a knight and fought at the siege of Perpignan

Works published

Great Britain
 John Leland, Naeniae in mortem Thomai Viati, neo-Latin poems on the death of Sir Thomas Wyatt the Elder, Great Britain

Other
 John Calvin, versifier, with Guillaume Franc's music, Geneva Psalter, a new revised edition, first published 1539 and several subsequent revisions in later years; Franc, cantor and music teacher in Geneva, Switzerland, contributed numerous tunes for this edition including Psalm 6, 8, 19, 22, 24 (also used for 62, 95 and 111), and 38 (see also, The Geneva Psalter 1539, 1543; 1560, an edition with changed melodies was published in 1551), Swiss, French-language work published in Geneva
 Antoine Héroët, Lyon: Etienne Dolet, France

Births

Death years link to the corresponding "[year] in poetry" article:
 June 24 – St. John of the Cross, in Spanish: "San Juan de la Cruz", born "Juan de Yepes Alvarez", (died 1591), Spanish mystic, poet, writer, Carmelite friar and priest, who was a major figure of the Catholic Reformation
 December – Catherine Des Roches. also known as "Catherine Fradonnet", (died 1587) French writer and poet; daughter of Madeleine Des Roches, the two hosted a literary circle which included  Scévole de Sainte-Marthe, Barnabé Brisson, René Chopin, Antoine Loisel, Claude Binet, Nicolas Rapin and Odet de Turnèbe
 date not known – Thomas Newton (poet) born about this year (died 1607), English physician, poet and translator

Deaths
Birth years link to the corresponding "[year] in poetry" article:
 September 21 – Juan Boscan, original Catalan name: "Joan Boscà Almogàver" (born c. 1490), Catalan poet who wrote in Spanish
 October 11 – Sir Thomas Wyatt the Elder (born c. 1503), English (see John Leland's work in "Works published" section)
 date not known – Sebastian Franck, who called himself "Franck von Word" died this year or in 1543 (born 1499), German freethinker, humanist, radical reformer and poet
 date not known – Malik Muhammad Jayasi (born 1477), Indian poet who wrote in the Avadhi dialect of Hindi

See also

 Poetry
 16th century in poetry
 16th century in literature
 French Renaissance literature
 Renaissance literature
 Spanish Renaissance literature

Notes

16th-century poetry
Poetry